Queen of the South is an American crime drama television series created by M.A. Fortin and Joshua John Miller. The series premiered on June 23, 2016, on USA Network and is an adaptation of the telenovela La Reina del Sur, which is also an adaptation of the novel of the same name by Spanish author Arturo Pérez-Reverte. The series centers around Teresa Mendoza (Alice Braga), a poor Mexican woman who becomes wealthy by building a vast drug empire. On October 1, 2018, it was announced that the USA Network had renewed the series for a fourth season which premiered on June 6, 2019. On August 29, 2019, the series was renewed for a fifth season. On March 8, 2021, it was announced that the fifth season is set to premiere on April 7, 2021 and will serve as the series' final season.

Series overview

Episodes

Season 1 (2016)

Season 2 (2017)

Season 3 (2018)

Season 4 (2019)

Season 5 (2021)

Ratings

Season 1

Season 2

Season 3

Season 4

Season 5

Notes

References

External links

Lists of American crime drama television series episodes